154  Age of Innocence  Edith Wharton  2012  ISBN 9781780201160  VDL2012 (UK)[printed in Germany]

Bibliography 

154 Age of Innocence Edith Wharton 2012 ISBN 9781780201160 VDL2012 (UK)[printed in Germany]

Variations Within The Series 

There are many variations within the WBR series.  The most common variations include cloth boards versus smooth boards, patterned end papers with ribbon bookmarks versus plain colored end papers without ribbon bookmarks, different colored covers but retaining the same embossed cover image, and books that have completely different cover art than other editions.

One example of cloth boards versus plain boards is Far From The Madding Crowd.  Both the cloth and the plain editions are the same color with the same artwork, only the material of the boards is different.  Other examples include Moby Dick, Treasure Island, O Pioneers, The Sea Wolf, and Uncle Tom's Cabin.

An example of the variation of patterned end papers with ribbon bookmarks versus plain colored end papers without bookmarks is Silas Marner.  Both books have the same artwork on the outside cover, but on the inside one edition has plain white end papers and the other has marble patterned end papers and a colored ribbon bookmark.  Other titles with this variation are Pride And Prejudice, The Call of the Wild/White Fang, The Scarlet Letter, The House of Seven Gables, The Last Of The Mohicans, A Tale Of Two Cities, Tess of the D'Urbervilles, A Connecticut Yankee In King Arthur's Court, Little Women, Jane Eyre, Great Expectations, Twice-Told Tales, and The Innocents Abroad.

An example of a title having different colored covers but retaining the same embossed artwork image is A Tale Of Two Cities.  Cover variations of A Tale of Two Cities include a blue cloth cover, a brown cloth cover, and a red cover.  Other editions with this variation include The Innocents Abroad, The Adventures of Sherlock Holmes, The Adventures of Huckleberry Finn, A Tale of Two Cities, Tales of Suspense, Silas Marner, Wuthering Heights (old cover style), Ben Hur, The Adventures Of Tom Sawyer, and The Return of Sherlock Holmes.

Tess of the D'Urbervilles is an example where in two editions the boards are the same color (gray) but the embossed parts of the cover and the faux quarter leather covering are different colors.  The artwork and faux leather is red in one edition and blue in the other edition.

Some books have been printed with completely different cover artwork from other editions.  Examples include Barchester Towers, The Jungle Books, Captains Courageous, Beau Geste, and Wuthering Heights.  For some books, such as The Jungle Books and Barchester Towers, the UK edition was published with illustrations where the American version was not.

A spelling variation in a book title occurs with A Journey to the Center of the Earth.  In the UK, the edition was published under the title A Journey to the Centre of the Earth.

In the United States, the James Hilton titles (Lost Horizon, Good-bye Mr. Chips and Other Stories) were printed in two separate volumes whereas in the UK edition, they were combined into one book.

Each edition in the WBR series includes a sheet folded in half numbered with page numbers one through four with a synopsis of the history of how the book came to be published and a short biography of the author and perhaps some information about the artist in illustrated editions.  On Our Selection/Our New Selection is different from the rest of the books because not only is the author biography insert included, but also a folder containing six 5.5" x 8.5" prints of artwork by artist Lionel Lindsay.  The prints included are titled Judy Wasn't Frightened Of Jew-Lizards, Sarah Thought It A Fine Effect, 'It's A Lie!' Dad roared, Daniel Damascus Rudd, Sir!, and Dad Come to See the Great Metropolis.  These are illustrations found in the actual book.  One print is not from the book.  It is not given a title and depicts the father scratching his bare head riding a horse in the woods at a walk towards the lower right hand foreground.

Reader's Digest also issued a book safe as part of the WBR series, Paradise Lost by John Milton.  The outside of the book safe is designed to look like other editions in the series, but inside the safe are two separated compartments.  The interior of the safe is lined with light gray velvet and is kept closed with velcro strips on the back of the cover and on the middle divider between the two compartments.

Vivat Direct Limited, t/a Reader's Digest, a publishing company in the UK that usually prints Reader's Digest Select Editions, has published World's Best Reading books starting in 2010: Kidnapped/Treasure Island, Wuthering Heights, Oliver Twist, Pride & Prejudice, A Study In Scarlet/The Hound Of The Baskervilles(), Moonstone, Robinson Crusoe, The War of the Worlds/The Time Machine, Jo's Boys, Three Men in a Boat/Three Men on the Bummel, and Ivanhoe.  These editions were published with insert pages like the other World's Best Reading books with the World's Best Reading logo at the top of the first page just like the other inserts.  However, the inserts have the initials WBR above the spelled out World's Best Reading on the insert pages and the WBR initials on the spine of the books.  These books are different from the original World's Best Reading books because they are bound in cloth and do not have the faux quarter leather binding over the spine.  They also have illustrations on the front and back covers, unlike the rest of the series which have illustrations on the front cover board only.

Notes

External links
World's Best Reading, collectors discussion forum, located at LibraryThing
Goodreads Group, for collectors.

Direct marketing
Reader's Digest
Literature lists